Tio fotografer (English: 'Ten photographers') was a Swedish photography collective founded on 10 October 1958 in Stockholm.

History 
Pictorialism as practiced in photography club competitions and exhibitions promoted a romantic national pride during the Second World War in neutral Sweden. Post-war, the country's young photographers reacted against the painterly pretensions of such practitioners whom they derisively nicknamed 'Rosenlunderiet' after an old peoples' home in Stockholm.

In 1949 some of the  young photographers, dubbed "De Unga" (The Young), who were to form Tio fotografer   participated in an exhibition organised by editor fo FOTO magazine Lars Wickman. It was an open provocation of the conservative photographic establishment.

The majority of the exhibitors returned to their specialities in fashion, journalism, nature photography, and so on, while the second-youngest, Rune Hassner, took up the cause of the young radicals, writing polemics in the trade journals.

In 1949 Stockholm’s 'Young Photographers'  Rune Hassner, Tore Johnsson, Sven Gillsater, Hans Hammarskiold and others saw themselves developing a new 'international language of photography.'  They were amongst many Scandinavian photographers of the post-war period to seek opportunities elsewhere in Europe. Tore Johnsson and Rune Hassner, went to Paris. When New York replaced Paris as the desirable destination for upcoming photographers in the 1960s Lennart Nilsson began there, before turning to scientific photography. Over the next decade members met occasionally and informally, in London, Cuba, New York or Hong Kong, and the idea of a photographic cooperative developed.

At a reunion on 10 October 1958 in Stockholm the ten photographers, who in the meantime had traveled and developed their careers, founded the collective Tio fotografer ('Ten photographers'). Ten years after their initial exhibition, the group formed their agency Tiofoto. The co-operative shared office, studio, and darkroom facilities in Stockholm, but otherwise remained independent in style and approach.

Members 
 Sten Didrik Bellander (1921–2001)
 Harry Dittmer (1910–2000)
 Sven Gillsäter (1921–2001)
 Rune Hassner (1928–2003)
 Georg Oddner (1923–2007)
 Lennart Olson (1925–2010)
 Hans Hammarskiöld (1925–2012)
 Tore Johnson (1928–1980)
 Hans Malmberg (1927–1977)
 Pål Nils Nilsson (1929–2002)
By the 1980s, to the ten founding members were added fifty new members.

Activity 
Tio's activities started with exhibitions: Lund in 1958, then Tio fotografer pa Svensk Form in Stockholm in 1960. Since then Tio had exhibitions in Sweden and abroad and its members have exhibited in Sweden and abroad on an individual basis.

Initially, the main concern of the members of Tio was the field of photojournalism and illustration and most of its members worked as magazine photographers, with some specializing in fashion, wild life, advertising or architecture. From 1965, television was making inroads on the audience for pictorial magazines.Ten years after its formation and without any formal decision, Tio changed its scope; seven of the 10 worked almost full-time work for television, cinema or audiovisual productions. Consequently, the stock sales department, Tiofoto expanded to include a dozen other free-lance photographers and included their material in the files, which by that stage held 200,000 photographic prints, about a million negatives, and a growing file of colour transparencies. Members of the group also made documentary films and television films, totalling, by the 1980s, more than 150 films and television programs, as well as feature films.

The group was influential in Swedish photography and they regularly exhibited at significant venues for photography. A US Library of Congress exhibition toured America during 1971-2, and the whole group was presented at the Hasselblad Centre in 1998.

Others dealt with teaching, conferences, research, and audio-visual production. Several also published many books. Pål-Nils Nilsson, Hans Hammarskiöld, Rune Hassner, Georg Oddner and Lennart Olson held prominent positions in the educational and institutional spheres and they regularly exhibited at significant venues for photography, and in 1998, the year Nilsson became a professor of photography at the Fothögskolan in Gothenburg, the whole group was presented at the Hasselblad Centre founded by Rune Hassner

Legacy 
An agency NordicPhotos founded in 2000 by Arnaldur Gauti Johnson, Kjartan Dagbjartsson, Hreinn Ágústsson and Thor Ólafsson, preserves and represents the Tiofoto  archive alongside Mira, Greatshots, IMS, Siluet, Nordic and the royalty free collection, Simply North.

Exhibitions 

 1949: Unga Fotografer, Rotohallen, Stockholm
 1951: Jeunes Photographes Suedois, Kodak Gallery, Paris
 1960: Tio fotografer pa Svensk Form, Stockholm
 1971-2: Contemporary Photographs From Sweden. US Library of Congress touring exhibition
 1976: Tio fotografer, Gal. Aronowitsch, Stockholm
 1977: Tio fotografer, Rencontres Internationales de Photographie, Arles (travelled to La Photogalerie, Paris)
 1982: 11 Fotografos Suecos, Consejo Mexicano de Fotografia, México
 2010, from 4 April: Ten Photographers: Sten Didrik Bellander, Harry Dittmer, Sven Gillsater, Hans Hammarskjöld, Rune Hassner, Tore Yngve Johnson, Hans Malmberg, Pal-Nils Nilsson, Georg Oddner, Lennart Olson. The Eighth International Photography Month in Moscow: Photobiennale 2010, State Museum of Contemporary Art, Gogolevsky boulevard,10, Moscow
 2010, 10 November–23 January 2011: Tio Fotografiska: The Collective. Institut suédois, 11 rue Payenne, 75003 Paris

Collections 

 IMP/GEH, Rochester, USA
 MOMA, New York, USA
 Musée d'Art moderne suédois, Stockholm, Sweden
 Musée municipal de Stockholm, Sweden
 Musée national suédois des Beaux-Arts, Stockholm, Sweden

References 

Photography organizations
Swedish photographers
1958 establishments
1959 establishments
Photography companies
Arts organizations established in 1958
Companies established in 1959
Artist cooperatives
Photojournalism organizations
Photo agencies